Fromentières may refer to the following places in France:

 Fromentières, Marne, a commune in the Marne department
 Fromentières, Mayenne, a commune in the Mayenne department